Heublein Inc. (also known as Heublein Spirits) was an American producer and distributor of alcoholic beverages and food throughout the 20th century.  During the 1960s and 1970s its stock was regarded as one of the most stable financial investments, earning it inclusion in the Nifty Fifty.

History

Heublein began as a restaurant founded in 1862 in Hartford, Connecticut, by Andrew Heublein, a German American entrepreneur. His two sons, Gilbert F. and Louis,  soon joined the business. In 1875 they accepted a large order for pre-mixed martini and manhattan cocktails for the annual picnic of the Governor's Foot Guard. Rain forced the event's cancellation. When a restaurant employee whom the brothers had instructed to dispose of the canceled cocktails several days later determined them to have withstood shelf storage safely, they began selling the pre-mixed  cocktails from the restaurant. So popular were the ready-made cocktails that Heublein built a distillery just to satisfy the demand. When the focus  of Andrew Heublein's business turned more heavily toward its lucrative line of ready-made cocktails in 1890, he transferred the business to his sons, and it became Gilbert F. Heublein and Bro. In 1906, the business acquired the rights to distribute (and later produce) A1 Steak Sauce for the US market, under license from Brand & Co. Ltd. of Vauxhall, London, UK. Heublein began selling it in the US under the name "Brand's A.1. Sauce".

It was a decidedly secondary sideline to Heublein's thriving cocktail business, with its promotions and advertising copy aimed at the carriage trade, delivering to hotels and even directly to the consumer at home. When it incorporated in the State of Connecticut on December 2, 1915, Heublein already had offices in New York as well as Hartford. Upon the enactment of Prohibition in 1920, Heublein's "secondary sideline" of A.1. Sauce served as a fortunate savior, when the production, transportation and sale of all other Heublein products became illegal in the US for the next thirteen years.

In 1938 Heublein acquired all rights to Smirnoff Vodka, a brand that had been produced in Russia prior to the October Revolution.  Heublein is credited with popularizing vodka in the United States by marketing Smirnoff as "White Whiskey" with the phrase "leaves you breathless", possibly the source of the mistaken belief that vodka on the breath conveys no aroma of alcohol.  Smirnoff became one of Heublein's most successful brands.  Heublein also acquired distribution rights in the United States to many other international spirits, wines, and beers that include Irish Mist liqueur, Harvey's Bristol Cream, Don Q Rum, Jose Cuervo, Black & White, Bell's whisky, Lancer's wines, Guinness Stout, and Bass Ale. Heublein also held American import and distribution rights to such non-alcoholic beverages as Perrier mineral water and Rose's Lime Juice.

Heublein's line of pre-mixed alcoholic cocktails comprised such traditional drinks as Manhattans, martinis, stingers, sidecars, and daiquiris, as well as such trendy drinks as the Brass Monkey, Pink Squirrel, Hobo's Wife, in addition to such Tiki drinks as the Mai Tai, Dr. Funk, and Navy Grog. In 1969, Heublein began selling some of these cocktails in eight-ounce cans. In the 1970s, Heublein introduced "Malcolm Hereford's Cow", a new line of flavored milk, 30-proof beverage (15% alcohol) that was popular primarily with women in particular, and college students of either gender. It became a fad briefly before vanishing into obscurity.

Heublein purchased Hamm's Brewery in 1965, sold it in 1973 to a group of Hamm's wholesalers, from whom Olympia Brewing Company bought it in 1975.

It also made many acquisitions outside of the liquor market, including Grey Poupon in 1936, Kentucky Fried Chicken in 1971, and Hart's Bakeries in 1972. In 1969, Heublein purchased a majority stake in United Vintners, which owned Inglenook, for $100 million. That same year, Heublein also purchased Beaulieu Vineyards for $8.5 million. These acquisitions gave Heublein one of the largest winemaking operations in the United States.

Acquisition and sell-off
In 1982, the R. J. Reynolds Tobacco Company acquired Heublein Inc. for $1.4 billion.  In the corporate reorganizations that followed the merger of R.J. Reynolds and Nabisco, the resulting corporation, RJR Nabisco, began selling off many of Heublein's assets. RJR Nabisco sold Kentucky Fried Chicken to PepsiCo in 1986 and sold the Heublein division and its alcoholic beverage brands to Grand Metropolitan in 1987.

In 1994, Heublein sold some of its wine and brandy business to Canandaigua Wine Company. In 1996, Grand Metropolitan ceased using the Heublein name, incorporating the business into International Distillers & Vintners.

Notes

References

Defunct companies based in Connecticut
American companies established in 1862
1862 establishments in Connecticut
Food and drink companies established in 1862
Drink companies of the United States
Food and drink companies based in Connecticut
1982 mergers and acquisitions